The Red Bridge is a road bridge that spans the South Thompson River in Kamloops, British Columbia. The  bridge carries two narrow road lanes of Mt. Paul Way between Lorne Street on the south bank of the river to the Mt. Paul industrial area on the north side. Mt. Paul Way then continues for  through the industrial park to intersect with Highway 5. The Red Bridge is of the Howe truss design, and is one of the only remaining functioning bridges of this type in British Columbia.

The bridge got its name from the red-coloured paint applied to the bridge's piers and, more prominently, pedestrian handrails. This legacy stretches back to the first and second bridges, meaning the name was already well-established by the time the current bridge was built. The wood surrounding the piers has not been repainted in many years, so the colour is barely visible, but a recent repainting along the edges of the bridge deck and the pedestrian handrails displays the namesake colour well.

History 
The current bridge is the third to open in that location. The first, which replaced a ferry, officially called the Government Bridge, was constructed in 1887; it contained a swing span to accommodate river traffic. In 1909, flooding in the region damaged the wooden structure of the bridge, and it was replaced in 1912. The 1912 bridge was destroyed by a fire in 1934 ignited by a spark thrown from a passing paddle steamer. The bridge erected in 1936 is the current structure, although it has seen many modifications and heavy repair in the 86 years it has stood.

 
Built at a time when automobiles were smaller and horse-and-buggy transport was still common (in Kamloops), the bridge is one of the narrowest two-lane roadways in the city. It has a total width over the main span of only , just wide enough to accommodate two  semi trailers side by side, with less than a foot of total room to spare. This was a regular occurrence prior to 1968, when the bridge serviced Highway 5. The width restriction often meant impromptu traffic control had to be put in place to allow only one truck to pass over the bridge at a time, especially if it was an oversized load.

See also
List of bridges in Canada

References

Bridges in British Columbia
Bridges completed in 1936
Road bridges in British Columbia
Buildings and structures in Kamloops
Kamloops